The Citizen Science Association also known as the CSA is a member based professional organization for practitioners and researchers of citizen science. The CSA was founded in 2013  in the United States and was ruled a charitable organization with a 501c3 designated status in June 2017. Ubiquity Press publishes an open source peer reviewed journal called Citizen Science: Theory and Practice on behalf of The Citizen Science Association.

History 
The concept for the Citizen Science Association originated at the Public Participation for Scientific Research Conference in 2012 held in conjunction with the Ecological Society of America conference in Portland, Oregon. Through a series of NSF grants (DRL-0610363, DRL-1020909, and DRL-0813135) the network of citizen science projects and professionals was further developed and the Citizen Science Association formation as an official organization developed along with a website. The Cornell Lab of Ornithology hosted the beginning of the Association web content and the Schoodic Institute helped launch the organization and is a continuing fiscal sponsor the CSA.

Activities 
The association also holds a professional focused conference series every two years for the practitioner and research community to discuss the best practices in citizen science titled the Citizen Science Association Conference or CitSciXXXX where XXXX would be replaced by the year. For example, CitSci2019 was held March 13–19, 2019. The association has a board of directors elected by the members and a collection of professional working groups establishing standards, identifying best practices, focusing research, building technology, and exploring the ethics of Citizen Science.

The Citizen Science Association has a memorandum of understanding with other Citizen Science Associations for collaboration and coordination. These other organizations include the European Citizen Science Association, the Australian Citizen Science Association, and the forming communities and associations in Asia (CitizenScience.Asia) and Africa. The United Nations officially recognised the Citizen Science Association and is working with the Citizen Science Global Partnership on how citizen science can best be applied to help tackle the Sustainable Development Goals.

Citizen Science Association working groups 
The working groups as with many professional organizations focus on priority areas of the science and practice of citizen science. As of February 2020 the following nine working groups have formed.

 Citizen Science Month
 Data and Metadata
 Education
 Ethics
 Environmental Justice Practitioners
 Integrity, Diversity, and Equity
 Law and Policy
 Professional Development
 Research and Evaluation

Citizen Science: Theory and Practice 
Citizen Science Association has a Ubiquity Press published, open-access, peer-reviewed journal called Citizen Science: Theory and Practice. Rather than focusing on reporting citizen science projects' scientific outcomes, but reporting research, review and synthesis, case studies, essays, methods, and meeting reports.

The journal is published online throughout the year along with special article collections.

See also 
List of citizen science projects

References

External links 
 Citizen Science Association Website
 Citizen Science: Theory and Practice
 Schoodic Institute and the Citizen Science Association
 Citizen Science Global Partnership
 Citizen Science Association Working Groups

Citizen science